Bob Norberg may refer to:
Bob Norberg (songwriter), songwriter who collaborated with Brian Wilson and the Beach Boys in the early 1960s
Bob Norberg (engineer), recording engineer for Capitol Records in the 1960s